Baron Merrivale, of Walkhampton in the County of Devon, is a title in the Peerage of the United Kingdom. It was created on 19 January 1925 for the Conservative politician and judge of the High Court of Justice, Sir Henry Duke.  the title is held by his great-grandson, the fourth Baron, who succeeded his father in 2007.

Barons Merrivale (1925)
Henry Edward Duke, 1st Baron Merrivale (1855–1939)
Edward Duke, 2nd Baron Merrivale (1883–1951)
Jack Henry Edmond Duke, 3rd Baron Merrivale (1917–2007)
Derek John Philip Duke, 4th Baron Merrivale (b. 1948)

The heir apparent is the present holder's son Hon. Thomas Duke.

References

Kidd, Charles, Williamson, David (editors). Debrett's Peerage and Baronetage (1990 edition). New York: St Martin's Press, 1990, 

Baronies in the Peerage of the United Kingdom
Noble titles created in 1925
Noble titles created for UK MPs